W0 may refer to:
 Nominal day, ignoring the variation followed via the Equation of Time, a variable in the equations of Arthur Thomas Doodson
 a variable for a word in the PICAXE microcontroller
 Short Run Consumption Function, the initial endowed wealth level of a particular individual in the Life-cycle Income Hypothesis
 first step of the W0–W6 scale for the classification of meteorites by weathering
 W0 may refer to the principal branch of the Lambert W Function